Nidra may refer to:

Nidra (1981 film), Malayalam film released in 1981 starring Vijay Menon and Shanthi Krishna
Nidra (2012 film), Malayalam film released in 2012 starring Siddharth Bharathan and Rima Kallingal